The 1971 Kentucky gubernatorial election was held on November 2, 1971.  Incumbent Republican Louie Nunn, was ineligible for a second term due to term limits, a rule that was later repealed in 1992.

In the Democratic primary, Lieutenant Governor Wendell Ford ran against former Governor Bert Combs and 6 other opponents.  Ford would win in an easy victory that wasn't expected. In the Republican primary, Thomas Emberton easily won his primary and was endorsed by Governor Nunn.

In the general election, Ford and Emberton were joined by former Governor A. B. "Happy" Chandler, running as an Independent, as well as American Party candidate William Smith.  The Republicans had hoped that Chandler would help Emberton's chances, but Ford ultimately won the general election. , this is the last time that the Republican candidate has won Jefferson County.

Democratic primary

Republican primary

Results

References

Gubernatorial
1971
Kentucky
November 1971 events in the United States